On November 3, 1817, John C. Calhoun (DR) of  resigned upon being appointed Secretary of War.  A special election was held for his replacement

Election results

Simkins took office on February 9, 1818

See also
List of special elections to the United States House of Representatives

References

South Carolina 1818 06
South Carolina 1818 06
1818 06
South Carolina 06
United States House of Representatives 06
November 1818 events
United States House of Representatives 1818 06